Zeynabad (also Romanized as Zeynābād, Zainābād, and Zīnābād) is a village in Jazin Rural District, in the Central District of Bajestan County, Razavi Khorasan Province, Iran. At the 2006 census, its population was 822, in 237 families.

References 

Populated places in Bajestan County